Rhipsalis russellii is a species of plant in the family Cactaceae. It is endemic to Brazil.  Its natural habitats are subtropical or tropical moist lowland forests and rocky areas. It is threatened by habitat loss.

References

russellii
Endemic flora of Brazil
Vulnerable plants
Taxonomy articles created by Polbot